is a Mecha first-person shooter video game released by Monolith Productions in 1998. It was the first game to use Monolith's flagship Lithtech engine. As well as performing missions on foot like other conventional FPS games, the game also allows the player to pilot a large mech.

Gameplay 
Shogo features a mix of both standard on-foot first person shooter action, and combat with anime-style bipedal mechs. Unlike mech simulator games such as the MechWarrior series, the mechs in Shogo are controlled essentially the same as in first-person shooter games.

An inherent feature of the combat system in Shogo is the possibility of critical hits, whereby attacking an enemy will occasionally bring about a health bonus for the player while the enemy in question loses more health than usual from the weapon used. However, enemy characters are also capable of scoring critical hits on the player.

Plot

Players take the role of Sanjuro Makabe, a Mobile Combat Armor (MCA) pilot and  a commander in the United Corporate Authority (UCA) army, during a brutal war for the planet Cronus and its precious liquid reactant, kato. Players must locate and assassinate a rebel leader known only as Gabriel. Prior to the game's first level, Sanjuro had lost his brother, Toshiro; his best friend, Baku; and his girlfriend, Kura, during the war. He is now driven by revenge and his romantic relationship with Kathryn, Kura's sister; in Sanjuro's words, "It's kinda complicated."

At two pivotal points in the game, the player also has the opportunity to make a crucial decision, which can alter the game's ending. While the first decision is almost purely a narrative decision, the second decision actually determines who the player will be facing the rest of the game and how the game will end.

Development and release
Shogo was originally known as Riot: Mobile Armor. It has heavy influences from Japanese animation, particularly Patlabor and Appleseed and the real robot mecha genre.

The game's lead designer Craig Hubbard expressed that Shogo "(although critically successful) fell embarrassingly short of  original design goals", and "it is a grim reminder of the perils of wild optimism and unchecked ambition" exercised by the relatively small development team. According to Hubbard, "The whole project was characterized by challenges. We had issues with planning, prioritization, ambition, scope, staffing, inexperience (including my own), and just about everything that can go wrong on a project. I think what saved the game was that we realized about six months before our ship date that there was no way we could make the game great, so we just focused on making it fun." This involved the team putting "all [their] energy in making the weapons really fun to use."

A later game developed by Monolith ended up becoming The Operative: No One Lives Forever, released in 2000. During the development of that game, it took a long time for Monolith to find a publishing partner. According to Hubbard, during this time, the game that became No One Lives Forever "mutated constantly in order to please prospective producers and marketing departments. The game actually started off as a mission-based, anime-inspired, paramilitary action thriller intended as a spiritual sequel to Shogo and ended up as a 60s spy adventure in the tradition of Our Man Flint and countless other 60s spy movies and shows." (Parts of the initial "paramilitary action thriller" concept evolved into F.E.A.R., another Monolith game, released after the No One Lives Forever series, in 2005.)

Cancelled Expansion packs  
The expansion pack Shugotenshi would have given more insight into Kura's roles. It would have been six or eight levels of Kura fighting and coming to terms with the death of Hank. Some features of that game would have been various body armor for Kura and new enemies and weapons for her.

Legacy of the Fallen would have moved away from the fighting of Cronus and taken the player to the remote kato mining facility at Iota-33. It would just show how well organized the Fallen actually were and the weapon capabilities of an Ambed (Advanced Mechanical Biological Engineering Division) team. Legacy of the Fallen was to have an entirely new cast of characters, five new mecha to choose from, six new onfoot weapons, five new mecha weapons, several new enemy aliens, and levels that played out more like Half-Life'''s levels in structure.

 Ports Shogo was ported to the Amiga PowerPC platform in 2001 by Hyperion Entertainment. Hyperion also made the Macintosh port and the Linux port of Shogo. The game had not sold as well as had hoped, most notably on Linux, despite becoming a best seller on Tux Games. Hyperion has put some of the blame on its publisher Titan Computer and because Linux users were likely to dual boot with Windows. A version for BeOS was also in development in 1999 by Be Inc.

Reception
Reviews

The game received "favorable" reviews, two points shy of "universal acclaim", according to the review aggregation website Metacritic. Next Generation said, "Obviously there are a lot of alternatives in this market, with Half-Life and SiN releasing at the same time, but Shogo has clear merits and stands up on its own. It's an excellent game and it will be a fine contender."

Sales
Monolith shipped 100,000 units of the game to retailers in the game's debut week, following its launch in early November 1998. However, the game underperformed commercially. It sold roughly 20,000 units in the United States during 1998's Christmas shopping season, a figure that Mark Asher of CNET Gamecenter called "disappointing". Combined with the failure of competitors SiN and Blood II: The Chosen, these numbers led him to speculate that the first-person shooter genre's market size was smaller than commonly believed, as the "only FPS game that has done really well [over the period] is Half-Life." Shogos low sales resulted in the cancellation of its planned expansion pack.

Analyzing Shogos performance in his 2003 book Games That Sell!, Mark H. Walker argued that it "never sold as well as it should have" because of Monolith's status as a small publisher. Shelf space for games was allotted based on a market development fund (MDF) system at the time: major retailers charged fees for advertising and endcap shelving, which publishers were required to pay before a game would be stocked. Because larger publishers could afford greater MDF spending than Monolith, Walker believed that Shogo'' "just couldn't get widespread distribution" in mainstream retail stores compared to its competitors.

References

External links 
 Official announcement for Shugotenshi on web.archive.org
 
 Modern port multiplayer servers on www.ShogoServers.com

1998 video games
AmigaOS 4 games
Commercial video games with freely available source code
First-person shooters
Linux games
LithTech games
Classic Mac OS games
Video games about mecha
Monolith Productions games
Video games developed in the United States
Video games scored by Daniel Bernstein
Video games scored by Guy Whitmore
Windows games
Cancelled BeOS games